Sackville—Cobequid is a provincial electoral district in  Nova Scotia, Canada, that elects one member of the Nova Scotia House of Assembly.

The riding was created in 1978 when the former district of Halifax Cobequid was redistributed. In 1993 the name was changed to Sackville-Cobequid and it gained the Lakeview area from Bedford-Musquodoboit Valley  and lost an area north of Beaverbank Road to Sackville-Beaver Bank. In 2003, there were minor changes made to the ridings northern boundary along Second Lake. In 2013, this district lost a small area along its northwestern edge to the new constituency of Sackville-Beaver Bank.

Its Member of the Legislative Assembly (MLA) since 2019 is Steve Craig of the Progressive Conservative party (PC), having succeeded longtime MLA Dave Wilson of the Nova Scotia New Democratic Party (NDP), who served from 2003 until resigning on November 16, 2018, triggering a by-election which Craig won.

Geography

Members of the Legislative Assembly

Election results

1978 general election

1981 general election

1984 general election

1988 general election

1993 general election

1998 general election

1999 general election

2003 general election

2006 general election

2009 general election

2013 general election 

|-
 
|New Democratic Party
|Dave Wilson
|align="right"|2,983
|align="right"|38.45
|align="right"|-26.89
|-
 
|Liberal
|Graham Cameron
|align="right"|2,898
|align="right"|37.35
|align="right"|+17.60  
|-
 
|Progressive Conservative
|Peter MacIsaac
|align="right"|1,651
|align="right"|21.28
|align="right"|+8.82 
|-

|}

2017 general election

2019 by-election

2021 general election

References

External links
riding profile

Nova Scotia provincial electoral districts
Politics of Halifax, Nova Scotia